Myosin-10 also known as myosin heavy chain 10 or non-muscle myosin IIB (NM-IIB) is a protein that in humans is encoded by the MYH10 gene. Non-muscle myosins are expressed in a wide variety of tissues, but NM-IIB is the only non-muscle myosin II isoform expressed in cardiac muscle, where it localizes to adherens junctions within intercalated discs. NM-IIB is essential for normal development of cardiac muscle and for integrity of intercalated discs. Mutations in MYH10 have been identified in patients with left atrial enlargement.

Structure 

NM-IIB is 228.9 kDa protein composed of 1976 amino acids. NM-IIB has an N-terminal globular head that harbors the catalytically active, magnesium(Mg)-ATPase. The C-terminal rod domain is an alpha helical coiled-coil that can multimerize with other myosin molecules to form a filament. Bound to the neck region of NM-IIB are two light chains; first, MLC17 stabilizes the molecule, while the second light chain, MLC20, modulates contraction. The exception to this rule is the alternatively spliced NM-IIB2 isoform, which has a 21 amino acid inserted into loop 2, near the actin-binding domain; actomyosin MgATPase activity of this isoform is not enhanced by phosphorylation of the regulatory light chain MLC20.

NM-IIB is part of the larger myosin II subfamily of proteins, which also includes skeletal muscle, cardiac muscle and smooth muscle myosins. NM-IIB, and non-muscle myosins in general, are widely expressed in every tissue in humans.

Function 

NM-IIB has many properties that are similar to those of smooth muscle myosins, such as the permissive nature of phosphorylation of the 20 kDa regulatory light chain for contraction. In skeletal muscle and cardiac muscle myosins, contraction is activated through thin filament proteins troponin and tropomyosin, whereas in NM-IIB and smooth muscle myosin, contraction initiates via regulatory light chain (MLC20) phosphorylation.

Various functions of NM-IIB require the phosphorylation of the regulatory light chain MLC20, including cell migration and cell adhesion. The two primary kinases catalyzing this reaction are the calcium-calmodulin-dependent, myosin light chain kinase and the Rho-GTP dependent, Rho kinase (ROCK). NM-IIB is dephosphorylated by a myosin phosphatase.

Detailed kinetic studies on NM-IIB show that this isoform of non-muscle myosin II has a slower actomyosin ATPase cycle relative to other myosin II isoforms, and that the markedly high affinity of NM-IIB head for ADP as well as the slow rate of ADP release can mechanistically explain affinity this finding. These data indicate that NM-IIB spends a large amount of its kinetic cycle in a configuration where it is strongly attached to actin.

NM-IIB, along with the other non-muscle myosin isoforms IIA and IIC, play a role in cell-cell and cell-matrix adhesion, cell migration, cell polarity, and embryonic stem cell apoptosis. Insights into the function of NM-IIB specifically have come from studies employing transgenic animals. NM-IIB is clearly required for normal development of cardiac muscle. Targeted gene disruption of NM-IIB resulted in approximately 65% embryonic lethality, and those that survived suffered from congestive heart failure and died day 1 following birth. Feature observed in NM-IIB knockouts was an increase in the transverse diameters of cardiomyocytes, ventricular septal defects, as well as other muscular abnormalities. NM-IIB is expressed early during embryonic development in cardiomyocytes, and appears to play a role in karyokinesis; ablation of NM-IIB caused defects in chromatid segregation and mitotic spindle formation, as well as abnormal structure of centrosomes.

In adult cardiomyocytes, NM-IIB redistributes from a diffuse cytoplasmic pattern in development to a localized Z-disc and intercalated disc distribution, where it colocalizes with alpha-actinin. NM-IIB is the only non-muscle myosin II isoform expressed in adult cardiac muscle (both IIa and IIB are expressed in skeletal muscle Z-discs, suggesting a specific function of NM-IIB in this cell type. NM-IIB may play a role in formation of mature sarcomeres in myofibrils. It appears that NM-IIB plays an essential role in maintaining normal adherens junction integrity and structure. A cardiac muscle-specific knockout of NM-IIB using the alpha-myosin heavy chain promoter-driven cre-recombinase develop enlarged cardiomyocytes, consistent with the defects previously observed with cytokinesis; widened adherens junctions; and progressive hypertrophic cardiomyopathy at 6 months. These data indicate that NM-IIB functions in ensuring the proper maintenance of intercalated disc structures.

Clinical Significance 
Single nucleotide polymorphisms in MYH10 were detected in patients with left atrial enlargement. MYH10 was identified to be a susceptibility gene using non-biased genome-wide linkage and peak-wide association analysis.

Interactions 

MYH10 has been shown to interact with:

 MYL6 and
 MYL9.

References

Further reading

External links